BMP2 or BMP-2 may refer to:

 Bone morphogenetic protein 2
 Boyevaya Mashina Pekhoty (BMP-2), a Soviet infantry fighting vehicle

See also
 BMP (disambiguation)
 BMP1 (disambiguation)
 BMP3 (disambiguation)
 BMP2K, BMP-2-inducible protein kinase